Gentiana nivalis, the snow gentian or Alpine gentian, is a species of the genus Gentiana. It grows to a height of 3–15 centimetres.

It is the county flower of Perthshire in the United Kingdom, and became a protected species in that country in 1975 under the Conservation of Wild Creatures and Wild Plants Act.

It is also one of the national flowers of Austria and Switzerland.

The Norwegian municipality Nord-Aurdal has G. nivalis in its coat of arms.

References

Further reading
 Xaver Finkenzeller: Alpenblumen, München 2003, 
 Manfred A. Fischer: Exkursionsflora von Österreich, Stuttgart 1994, 

nivalis
Alpine flora
Flora of Europe
Flora of Italy
Plants described in 1753
Taxa named by Carl Linnaeus
Flora of Greenland
Flora of the Alps
Flora of the Carpathians
Flora of the Pyrenees